The Bankruptcy Reform Act of 1978 (November 6, 1978) is a United States Act of Congress regulating bankruptcy.

The current Bankruptcy Code was enacted in 1978 by § 101 of the Act which generally became effective on October 1, 1979. The current Code completely replaced the former Bankruptcy Act of 1898, sometimes called the "Nelson Act" (Act of July 1, 1898, ch. 541). The current Code has been amended multiple times since 1978. (See, e.g. Bankruptcy Abuse Prevention and Consumer Protection Act of 2005.)

This Act prohibits employment discrimination against anyone who has declared bankruptcy.

See also
Bankruptcy Act

United States bankruptcy legislation
1978 in American law
History of bankruptcy law